Speedy Gonzales is a 1955 Warner Bros. Merrie Melodies animated short directed by Friz Freleng from a story by Warren Foster. The short was released on September 17, 1955, and stars Speedy Gonzales and Sylvester.

Plot
The short opens on a small, worried group of Mexican mice thinking of how to get cheese from the AJAX cheese factory across the Mexico–United States border that is guarded by Sylvester. Sylvester has eaten any mice who have tried. The leader comes up with a brilliant idea: Gain the services of the aptly named "Speedy Gonzales". The group agrees, so the leader goes to the carnival where Speedy resides.

Speedy Gonzales is at the carnival attraction "Shoot Speedy" in which people try to shoot Speedy with bullets from a gun in order to "win a beeg prize." The leader tells Speedy, in Spanish, about the dire situation the mice are in, not having access to the cheese guarded by Sylvester. Speedy agrees to help and runs through the field between the mice and Sylvester to fetch an armful of cheese with each turn. After failing to catch Speedy by hand, Sylvester employs a hand net, mousetraps, landmines, baseball equipment, and a pipe to funnel Speedy right into his mouth, but Speedy manages to thwart him every time.

Finally getting fed up, Sylvester gets all the cheese from the factory, stacks it, and uses dynamite to blow it all up. However, all the cheese ends up raining down on the mice, causing Sylvester to cry and bang his head on an electric pole in vexation. Speedy ends the short by saying: "I like this pussycat fellow; he's silly!"

Production notes
Speedy Gonzales won the Academy Award for Best Animated Short Film in 1955.

This short marks the first appearance of a redesign for Speedy, after his initial appearance in Cat-Tails for Two.

Home media
Speedy Gonzalas can be found on Disc 4 of the Looney Tunes Golden Collection: Volume 1.
Warner Bros. Home Entertainment Academy Awards Animation Collection: 15 Winners (restored)

See also
List of American films of 1955

References

External links

 

1955 films
1955 short films
1955 comedy films
1955 animated films
1950s English-language films
1950s Warner Bros. animated short films
American animated short films
Merrie Melodies short films
Best Animated Short Academy Award winners
Speedy Gonzales films
Sylvester the Cat films
Animated films set in the United States
Films set in Mexico
Short films directed by Friz Freleng
Films scored by Carl Stalling
Warner Bros. Cartoons animated short films
Mexico–United States border